William M. Farrow Jr. (June 15, 1918 – September 3, 2003) was an American professional basketball player. He played in the National Basketball League for the Youngstown Bears (32 games in 1946–47) and Dayton Rens (three games in 1948–49), where he averaged 5.3 points per game for his career.

References

External links
 Chicago Tribune obituary

1918 births
2003 deaths
American men's basketball players
Basketball players from Chicago
Centers (basketball)
Dayton Rens players
Kentucky State Thorobreds basketball players
Youngstown Bears players
United States Army Air Forces personnel of World War II
United States Army Air Forces officers
Military personnel from Illinois